Laymon Ramsey (August 24, 1917 – April 7, 2003) was an American Negro league pitcher in the 1940s.

A native of Grady, Alabama, Ramsey served in the US Marines during World War II. He played for the Memphis Red Sox in 1947, posting a 1.29 ERA over 14 innings in two recorded games for the Red Sox. Ramsey died in Birmingham, Alabama in 2003 at age 85.

References

External links
 and Seamheads

1917 births
2003 deaths
Memphis Red Sox players
Baseball pitchers
Baseball players from Alabama
People from Montgomery County, Alabama
United States Marine Corps personnel of World War II
African Americans in World War II
21st-century African-American people
African-American United States Navy personnel